The Caproni Ca.161 was an aircraft built in Italy in 1936, in an attempt to set a new world altitude record. It was a conventional biplane with two-bay, staggered wings of equal span, based on Caproni's Ca.113 design. The pressure-suited pilot was accommodated in an open cockpit.

Operational history
On 8 May 1937, Lieutenant Colonel Mario Pezzi broke the world altitude record with a flight to 15,655 m (51,362 ft). The following year, Pezzi broke the record again in the more powerful Ca.161bis, making a flight to 17,083 m (56,047 ft) on 22 October 1938. The Grob Strato 2C broke this record for piston-powered crewed airplanes generally in 1995, but as of 2023 it still stands for piston-powered biplanes, and for crewed single engine piston aircraft.

A final altitude record for floatplanes was set on 25 September 1939 in the float-equipped Ca.161Idro, piloted by Nicola di Mauro to 13,542 m (44,429 ft). As of 2012, this record also still stands.

Variants
 Ca.161 – original version with Piaggio P.XI R.C.72 engine
 Ca.161bis – improved version with Piaggio P.XI R.C.100/2v
 Ca.161Idro – floatplane version

Specifications (Ca.161bis)

Data from Italian Civil and Military Aircraft 1930–1945 apart from weights

See also

References

 
 

Ca.161
1930s Italian experimental aircraft
Aircraft first flown in 1936
Biplanes
Single-engined tractor aircraft